Ashley Gearing (born May 15, 1991) is an American country music artist. She has charted four singles on the Billboard Hot Country Songs charts.

Biography
Ashley Gearing was born May 15, 1991 in Springfield, Massachusetts.

Ashley Gearing made her chart debut in 2003 with the song "Can You Hear Me When I Talk to You?", which peaked at No. 36 on the U.S. Billboard Hot Country Singles & Tracks charts. At the time of its release, the song made Gearing the youngest female artist to enter that chart, at twelve years and one month. This beat a record set by Brenda Lee in 1957. The song was issued as a single on Lyric Street Records. The song is about a child who loses her father at an early age.

At the age of twelve, Gearing sang "When You Wish Upon a Star" on Disneymania 2 and "If You Can Dream"  which was certified gold by the RIAA on Disney Princess: The Ultimate Song Collection.

Her first full-length album, Maybe It's Time, was released on the independent label in 2006. This album included the single "I Found It in You". In 2007, she signed with major label Curb Records, charting again with the single "Out the Window" in mid-2008. A second Curb single, "What You Think About Us," was given a release of July 2010.

Discography

Studio albums

EPs

Singles

Guest singles

Music videos

References

https://www.bostonglobe.com/arts/music/2015/10/24/springfield-ashley-gearing-youngest-female-artist-hit-country-charts/1P3UzHxOb8mikpSrTjEygO/story.html?outputType=amp

External links 
Official Website
CMT Artist Profile — Country Music Television

1991 births
American child singers
American women country singers
American country singer-songwriters
Curb Records artists
Living people
Lyric Street Records artists
Musicians from Springfield, Massachusetts
Singer-songwriters from Massachusetts
Williston Northampton School alumni
21st-century American singers
21st-century American women singers